Igor Yevgenyevich Sklyarov (born 31 August 1966) is a former Russian footballer.

Background
Igor grew up in Russia, playing football his whole life, and eventually got the chance to play in the 1988 Olympics with the USSR. He helped his team win the gold in the Olympics. He won 1 cap for the Russia national football team in 1993.

He married his wife Natalia Yurchenko, who is a 5-time world champion in gymnastics, in November 1988. The family moved to the US in 1999, settling in Lehigh Valley, Pennsylvania where Igor coached year round football and Natalia was a gymnastics coach. In January 2009, Igor accepted a position with a professional soccer club in Novosibirsk, Russia. Now he lives in Chicago coaching the u-14 team, FC Drive.

Honours
 Soviet Top League bronze: 1990.
 Russian Premier League bronze: 1992, 1993.

European club competitions
 UEFA Cup 1987–88 with FC Dynamo Moscow: 4 games.
 UEFA Cup 1991–92 with FC Dynamo Moscow: 4 games.
 UEFA Cup 1992–93 with FC Dynamo Moscow: 6 games, 2 goals.

Coaching and Training
 Gold Medal winner Men's soccer team, 1988 Olympics, Seoul, Korea
 Pro Player FC "Dynamo", Moscow, 245 Premier League games
 1998 Evaluator U-18 National Youth Team
 Head Coach, Saucon Valley High School boys team
 Head Coach, ENCO U-17 boys team
 Head Coach, Western Lehigh United U-15 boys team
 Director "Pro Olympic Soccer Program"
 European soccer scout of USA, Present of Spain, Germany, France, England, Ukraine, Russia

Education
 Bachelor's degree in Physical Education
 Diploma of Physical Culture and Coaching
 International Coach License 'B'
 NSCAA Coach License

References

External links
 Profile at RussiaTeam 

1966 births
Living people
Russian footballers
Russia international footballers
Soviet footballers
Olympic footballers of the Soviet Union
Footballers at the 1988 Summer Olympics
Olympic gold medalists for the Soviet Union
Russian Premier League players
FC Dynamo Moscow players
FC SKA Rostov-on-Don players
Sportspeople from Taganrog
FC Metallurg Lipetsk players
Olympic medalists in football
FC Taganrog players
Soviet Top League players
Medalists at the 1988 Summer Olympics
Association football midfielders
Association football defenders
FC Spartak Ryazan players